Lieutenant Colonel Thomas Bunbury   (19 May 1791 – 25 December 1861) was an officer in the British Army during the early Victorian period. He was commandant of the convict settlement at Norfolk Island for a period in 1839. He later served in New Zealand and British India.

Biography
Born on 19 May 1791 in Gibraltar, the son of Benjamin Bunbury, an officer of the 32nd Regiment, Bunbury was later placed in a school at the village of Catterick, North Yorkshire upon his father's marriage to Ann Cowling, daughter of Henry Cowling of Richmond, North Yorkshire, in 1797. He was later educated at Staindrop, County Durham, until his father moved to Hyde End and Cope Hall, near Newbury, Berkshire, then to tuition under the Rev. J Meredith at Walsh Common. Later he was sent on to Bicheno's Newbury seminary, where in 1807 he learned that an ensigncy in the 90th Regiment had been conferred upon him from 12 March that year. Following an incident at a family dinner with his uncle, Lieutenant Colonel Hamilton Welch Bunbury, 3rd Regiment, he was transferred to the 3rd Regiment on 22 August 1807, and joined the 2nd Battalion under Colonel Bingham at Cirencester.

Bunbury fought in the Peninsular War, having arrived at Fort St. Julien, Lisbon, on HMS Plover in November 1808. He was wounded during the war, and considered becoming an artist after it ended, spending time in Paris. In 1822, he joined the 80th Regiment, based in Malta. In 1825, he transferred to the 85th Regiment of Foot for a period of service in Spain before returning to the 80th Regiment, with which he later served in England. In 1837, Bunbury was sent to Australia and in due course the Governor of New South Wales, George Gipps, ordered him take command of the garrison and convict settlement at Norfolk Island.

He was commandant at Norfolk Island from April to July 1839. As commandant, he was confident in his ability to manage the hardened convicts under his command. He wrote that he could not understand why "a villain who has been guilty of every enormity, should feel shame at having his back scratched with the cat-o-nine-tails when he felt none for his atrocious crimes."  He also claimed that "if a man is too sick to work he is too sick to eat" and claimed that the queue at the hospital was halved. Although his punishments were harsh, he replaced hand hoeing with ploughs, rewarded good behaviour with improved jobs and gave older convicts lighter work. He earned the ire of the soldiers on the island by ordering the destruction of huts built on the small gardens they kept for their own use and for trafficking with the convicts. The soldiers mutinied, a warship was sent to restore peace and Bunbury was recalled in July 1839.

In 1840, after William Hobson, Lieutenant-Governor of New Zealand, suffered a stroke, Bunbury was sent by Gipps to New Zealand with instructions to take over as Lieutenant-Governor if Hobson was incapacitated, but he had recovered. Bunbury took the Treaty of Waitangi to the South Island on HMS Herald and took possession of the island. He was made a magistrate in 1841 and acted as Deputy Governor in January 1844. The Surveyor General, Felton Mathew, when surveying and planning Auckland in 1841, named the tip of a peninsula to the west of the town after him, Point Bunbury, later renamed Point Chevalier.

Later in 1844 he was sent to India. While in transit to Calcutta, his ship was wrecked on the Andaman Islands. For his leadership of the 600 odd survivors until they were rescued, he was appointed a Companion of the Order of the Bath. He later served in the First Anglo-Sikh War and was present at most of the major battles of the campaign in India, including the Battle of Sobraon.

Bunbury retired from the British Army on 31 December 1849 with the rank of lieutenant colonel and returned to England, marrying soon after his arrival in the country. He wrote his memoirs which were published in 1861. He died early the following year.

Publications

Further reading

References

1791 births
1862 deaths
British Army officers
90th Regiment of Foot officers
Cameronians officers
South Staffordshire Regiment officers
Norfolk Island penal colony administrators
Treaty of Waitangi
British Army personnel of the Napoleonic Wars
19th-century New Zealand military personnel